Pterolophia bangi is a species of beetle in the family Cerambycidae. It was described by Maurice Pic in 1937.

References

bangi
Beetles described in 1937